Ralph Tennyson Jefferson (July 7, 1895 – death unknown) was an American Negro league outfielder and member of the Pennsylvania House of Representatives.

Early life and career
A native of Hearne, Texas, Jefferson attended Atlanta University. He made his Negro leagues debut in 1920 with the Indianapolis ABCs, and played with several teams through the 1924 season. Following his baseball career, he was editor of The Negro American magazine, and was elected to the Pennsylvania House of Representatives for the 1941-1942 session.

Personal life
On April 16, 1932, Jefferson married Helen Daisy Stinson of Chatham, Virginia.

References

Further reading
 Advertisement (February 21, 1925). "Sporting Goods and Radio". p. 7
 Eagle staff (May 2, 1940). "9 Enter Race for Pa. Legislature". The California Eagle. p. 1
 Tribune staff (April 13, 1941). "Against Swing". Scrantonian Tribune. p. 16
 Associated Press (May 6, 1941). Milk Price Fixing Plan Is Dropped; Tax Bills to Move; Legislature". Lancaster Intelligencer-Journal. pp. 1, 4

External links
 and Baseball-Reference Black Baseball stats and Seamheads

1895 births
Place of death missing
Year of death missing
Bacharach Giants players
Brooklyn Royal Giants players
Cuban Stars (East) players
Indianapolis ABCs players
Washington Potomacs players
African-American state legislators in Pennsylvania
Members of the Pennsylvania House of Representatives
Atlanta University alumni
Baseball outfielders